William Dwight Billings (December 29, 1910 – January 4, 1997) was an American ecologist. He was one of the foundational figures in the field of plant physiological ecology and made major contributions to desert and arctic/alpine ecology.

Billings served as president of the Ecological Society of America (ESA) from 1978 to 1979. He was elected a Fellow of the American Academy of Arts and Sciences in 1979. In 1962, ESA granted him the Mercer Award, for an outstanding research paper by a researcher under the age of 40; ESA also awarded the Eminent Ecologist Award in 1991.

Career chronology

His advisees include Robin B. Foster.

References

Other sources

 Arctic and Alpine Research, Vol. 29 (1997): 253-254.
 Contemporary Authors, Vol. 113 (1985).
 Bulletin of the Ecological Society of America, Vol. 78(2) (1997): 115-117.
 Arctic, Vol. 50(3) (1997): 275-276.

External links
 Biographical Sketch by Charles Smith
 Obituary by Dr. Kim Peterson

1910 births
1997 deaths
American ecologists
Fellows of the American Academy of Arts and Sciences
Scientists from Washington, D.C.